Velm-Götzendorf is a town in the district of Gänserndorf in the Austrian state of Lower Austria.

Geography
Velm-Götzendorf lies in the Weinviertel in Lower Austria. Only about 2.95 percent of the municipality is forested.

Sub-divisions
 Velm
 Götzendorf

References

External links
Municipal website

Cities and towns in Gänserndorf District